Heirisson Island is an island in the Swan River in Western Australia at the eastern end of Perth Water, between the suburbs of East Perth and Victoria Park. The next upstream island is Kuljak Island,  then Ron Courtney Island, with no islands in the Swan River downstream between Heirisson Island and the Indian Ocean other than the artificial islet in Elizabeth Quay. 

Before development, there were several small islands, surrounded by mudflats. Over the years, dredging and reclamation has created a single island, which is now a landscaped nature reserve, with a  walking path. The Noongar name for the area is Matagarup (meaning "leg deep"), which has been retained for the single island after reclamation.

Heirisson Island is listed on the Western Australia Department of Aboriginal Affairs' Register of Aboriginal Sites, as ID 3589.

History

The area around Heirisson Island is traditionally associated with the Beeloo people, a subgroup of the Whadjuk Noongar, who knew the small islands and mud flats as Matagarup, referring to the river as being "one leg deep". The island located on either side of the current causeway bridge was known as Kakaroomup.

The Matagarup mud flats were the first major crossing point upriver from the river's mouth (at Fremantle) and were an important seasonal access way over which the Beeloo gave other groups right of passage across the river.

The first European to visit the Heirisson Island area was the Flemish explorer Willem de Vlamingh in January 1697. He was exploring the Swan River in longboats but only got as far as the Heirisson Island(s) because the mud flats impeded any further progress.

Heirisson Island was named after French midshipman , who was on the French ship Le Naturaliste on a scientific expedition led by Nicolas Baudin between 1801 and 1804.  The expedition made several journeys up the river from Fremantle in longboats and made the first maps of the Swan River. The island was named in June 1801. Captain James Stirling later investigated the area in 1827 just before the Swan River Colony was settled in 1829.

In September 1984 the Government of Western Australia erected a statue of Aboriginal warrior Yagan on the island. In 1997 the statue's head was twice removed by vandals.

In 1998, five female western grey kangaroos were introduced onto the island, followed by a female with a male joey in 2000.

In 2008 a new master plan for Heirisson Island was adopted by the City of Perth which proposed establishing an international quality sculpture park on the island as well as constructing an amphitheatre and a footbridge that would link Point Fraser to Heirisson Island. The plan faced opposition from Aboriginal elders, and as of December 2022 the sculpture park and amphitheatre have yet to be established.

In December 2022, the construction of two pedestrian and cyclist bridges was approved that will connect Point Fraser and McCallum Park in Victoria Park via Heirisson Island. The $100 million bridge project will begin construction in 2023 for an intended late 2024 opening.

Aboriginal protests
Heirisson Island has been the site of a number of protests by Australian Aboriginal activists.

Tent embassy
In 2012, the island was the site of a tent embassy, set up in February by Noongar people to raise community awareness about problems with a government plan to extinguish most of the native title land in the southwest of Western Australia that was recognized in 2006 by Justice Murray Wilcox of the Federal Court of Australia. The Noongar Tent Embassy was intended to be a peaceful affirmation of native title to Noongar country and legitimate use of a state-registered Aboriginal Heritage Site, and was inspired by the Aboriginal Tent Embassy in Canberra.  However, there were many claims made of rocks being thrown at passing boats. The tent embassy was removed by police in March 2012.

Refugee camp
In early March 2015, a group of Aboriginal activists set up what they referred to as a refugee camp after the state government announced plans to close some remote Western Australian Aboriginal communities. The camp was removed ten days later by City of Perth rangers, with police support, but gradually reassembled and was occupied by about 100 people when it was dismantled again by police and City of Perth rangers in late April 2015.

In January 2016 a group of about 60 peopleincluding some non-indigenous homeless peoplewere camping on the island again. By April 2016, the camp had grown to over 100 and it was again removed by police and rangers.

See also
Islands of Perth, Western Australia

References

External links
 Vintage aerial photograph by Frank Hurley at the National Library of Australia

Perth Water
Islands of the Perth region (Western Australia)
Artificial islands of Australia